The minimal genome is a concept which can be defined as the set of genes sufficient for life to exist and propagate under nutrient-rich and stress-free conditions. Alternatively, it can also be defined as the gene set supporting life on an axenic cell culture in rich media, and it is thought what makes up the minimal genome will depend on the environmental conditions that the organism inhabits. By one early investigation, the minimal genome of a bacterium should include a virtually complete set of proteins for replication and translation, a transcription apparatus including four subunits of RNA polymerase including the sigma factor rudimentary proteins sufficient for recombination and repair, several chaperone proteins, the capacity for anaerobic metabolism through glycolysis and substrate-level phosphorylation, transamination of glutamyl-tRNA to glutaminyl-tRNA, lipid (but no fatty acid) biosynthesis, eight cofactor enzymes, protein export machinery, and a limited metabolite transport network including membrane ATPases. Proteins involved in the minimum bacterial genome tend to be substantially more related to proteins found in archaea and eukaryotes compared to the average gene in the bacterial genome more generally indicating a substantial number of universally (or near universally) conserved proteins. The minimal genomes reconstructed on the basis of existing genes does not preclude simpler systems in more primitive cells, such as an RNA world genome which does not have the need for DNA replication machinery, which is otherwise part of the minimal genome of current cells.

This minimal genome concept assumes that genomes can be reduced to a bare minimum, given that they contain many non-essential genes of limited or situational importance to the organism. Therefore, if a collection of all the essential genes were put together, a minimum genome could be created artificially in a stable environment. By adding more genes, the creation of an organism of desired properties is possible. The concept of minimal genome arose from the observations that many genes do not appear to be necessary for survival.  In order to create a new organism a scientist must determine the minimal set of genes required for metabolism and replication. This can be achieved by experimental and computational analysis of the biochemical pathways needed to carry out basic metabolism and reproduction. A good model for a minimal genome is Mycoplasma genitalium due to its very small genome size. Most genes that are used by this organism are usually considered essential for survival; based on this concept a minimal set of 256 genes has been proposed.

Genome reduction in nature

Bacteria, Archaea, and Symbionts 
The smallest known genome of a free-living bacterium is 1.3 Mb with ~1100 genes. However, significantly more reduced genomes are commonly observed in naturally occurring symbiotic and parasitic organisms. Genome reduction driven by mutation and genetic drift in small and asexual populations with biases for gene deletion can be seen in symbionts and parasites, which commonly experience rapid evolution, codon reassignments, biases for AT nucleotide compositions, and elevated levels of protein misfolding which results in a heavy dependence on molecular chaperones to ensure protein functionality. These effects, which coincide with the proliferation of mobile genetic elements, pseudogenes, genome rearrangements, and chromosomal deletion are best studied and observed in more recently evolved symbionts. The cause for this is that the symbiont or parasite can outsource a usual cellular function to another cell and so, in the absence of needing to carry out this function for itself, subsequently lose its own genes meant to perform this function. The most extreme examples of genome reduction have been found in maternally transmitted endosymbionts which have experienced lengthy coevolution with their hosts and, in the process, lost a substantial amount of their cellular autonomy. Beneficial symbionts have a greater capacity for genome reduction than do parasites, as host co-adaptation allows them to lose additional crucial genes. Another important distinction between genome reduction in parasites and genome reduction in endosymbionts is that parasites lose both the gene and its associated function, whereas endosymbionts often retain the function of the lost gene since that function is taken over by the host. The genes which most frequently survive gene loss include those involved in DNA replication, transcription, and translation, although a number of exceptions are known. For example, loss can be frequently seen in subunits of the DNA polymerase holoenzyme and some DNA repair genes. The majority of ribosomal proteins are retained (though some like RpmC are sometimes missing). In some cases, some tRNA synthetases are lost. Gene loss is also seen in genes for components in the cellular envelope, biosynthesis of biomolecules like purine, energy metabolism, and more. 

For endosymbionts in some lineages, it is possible for the entire genome to be lost. For example, some mitosomes and hydrogenosomes (degenerate versions of the mitochondria known in some organisms) have experienced a total gene loss and have no remaining genes, whereas the human mitochondria still retains some of its genome. The extant genome in the human mitochondrial organelle is 16.6kb in length and contains 37 genes. Between organisms, the mitochondrial genome can code for between 3 to 67 proteins, with suggestions that the last eukaryotic common ancestor encoded a minimum of 70 genes in its genome. The smallest known mitochondrial genome is that of Plasmodium falciparum, with a genome size of 6kb containing three protein-coding genes and a few rRNA genes. (On the other hand, the largest known mitochondrial genome is 490kb.) Genomes nearly as small can be found in related apicomplexans as well. On the other hands, the mitochondrial genomes of land plants have expanded to over 200kb with the largest one (at over 11Mb) exceeding the size of the genome of bacteria and even the simplest eukaryotes. Organelles known as plastids in plants (including chloroplasts, chromoplasts, and leucoplasts), once free-living cyanobacteria, typically retain longer genomes on the order of 100-200kb with 80-250 genes. In one analysis of 15 chloroplast genomes, the analyzed chloroplasts had between 60-200 genes. Across these chloroplasts, a total of 274 distinct protein-coding genes were identified, and only 44 of them were universally found in all sequenced chloroplast genomes. Examples of organisms which have experienced genome reduction include species of Buchnera, Chlamydia, Treponema, Mycoplasma, and many others. Comparisons of multiple sequenced genomes of endosymbionts in multiple isolates of the same species and lineages have confirmed that even long-time symbionts are still experiencing ongoing gene loss and transfer to the nucleus. Nuclear integrants of mitochondrial or plastid DNA have sometimes been termed "numts" and "nupts" respectively.

The minimal genome correlates to small genome sizes, given the consistent relationship between genome size and number of protein-coding genes in bacteria, where one gene on average correlates to one kilobase of genome sequence (although organelles are a frequent exception). Mycoplasma genitalium, a human urogenital pathogen which has a genome of size 580 kb and consists of only 482 protein-coding genes, has been used as a prime model for minimal genomes. A number of symbionts have now been discovered with genomes under 500 kb in length, the majority of them being bacterial symbionts of insects typically from the taxa Pseudomonadota and Bacteroidota. The parasitic archaea Nanoarchaeum equitans has a genome 491 kb in length. In 2002, it was found that some species of the genus Buchnera have a reduced genome of only 450 kb in size. In 2021, the endosymbiont "Candidatus Azoamicus ciliaticola" was found to have a genome 290 kb in length. The symbiont Zinderia insecticola was found to have a genome of 208 kb in 2010. In 2006, another endosymbiont Carsonella ruddii was found with a reduced genome 160 kb in length encompassing 182 protein-coding genes. Surprisingly, it was found that gene loss in Carsonella symbionts is an ongoing process. Other intermediate stages in gene loss have been observed in other reduced genomes, including the transition of some genes into pseudogenes as a result of accumulating mutations that are not selected against since the host carries out the needed purpose of that gene. The genome of Candidatus Hodgkinia cicadicola, a symbiont of cicadas, was found to be 144 kb. In 2011, Tremblaya princeps was found to contain an intracellular endosymbiont with a genome of 139 kb, reduced to the point that even some translation genes had been lost. In the smallest to date, a 2013 study found some bacterial symbionts of insects with even smaller genomes. Specifically, two leafhopper symbionts contained highly reduced genomes: while Sulcia muelleri had a genome of 190 kb, Nasuia deltocephalinicola had a genome of only 112 kb and contains 137 protein-coding genes. Combined, the genomes of these two symbionts can only synthesize ten amino acids, in addition to some of the machinery involved in DNA replication, transcription, and translation. The genes for ATP synthesis through oxidative phosphorylation have been lost, however.

Viruses and virus-like particles 
Viruses and virus-like particles have the smallest genomes in nature. For instance, bacteriophage MS2 consists of only 3569 nucleotides (single-stranded RNA) and encodes just four proteins which overlap to make efficient use of the genome space.  Similarly, among eukaryotic viruses, porcine circoviruses are among the smallest.  They encode only 2–3 open reading frames. Viroids are circular molecules RNA which do not have any protein-coding genes at all, although the RNA molecule itself acts as a ribozyme to help enable its replication. The genome of a viroid is between 200-400 nucleotides in length.

Rise of the minimal genome and construction of synthetic mycoplasma 
This concept arose as a result of a collaborative effort between National Aeronautics and Space Administration (NASA) and two scientists: Harold Morowitz and Mark Tourtellotte. In the 1960s, NASA was searching for extraterrestrial life forms, assuming that if they existed they may be simple creatures. To attract people's attention, Morowitz published about mycoplasmas as being the smallest and simplest self-replicating creatures. NASA and the two scientists grouped together and came up with the idea to assemble a living cell from the components of mycoplasmas. Mycoplasmas were selected as the best candidate for cell reassembly, since they are composed of a minimum set of organelles, such as a plasma membrane, ribosomes and a circular double stranded DNA. Morowitz' major idea was to define the entire machinery of mycoplasmas cell in molecular level. He announced that an international effort would help him accomplish this main objective.
The main plan consisted of: 
 physical and functional mapping with complete sequencing of the mycoplasma
 Determine the open reading frames (ORFs)
 Determining the encoded amino acids
 Understanding the functions of genes
 Final step: reassemble mycoplasma's cellular machinery.

By the 1980s, Richard Herrmann's laboratory had fully sequenced and genetically characterized the 800kb genome of M. pneumoniae. Despite the small size of the genome, this was still a three year process. In 1995, another laboratory from Maryland the Institute for Genomic Research (TIGR) collaborated with the teams of Johns Hopkins and the University of North Carolina. This group chose to sequence the genome of Mycoplasma genitalium, consisting of only 580 kb genome. This was accomplished in 6 months.

The sequencing data from M. genitalium led to the discovery of some conserved genes, which ultimately helped in defining essentiality to life, of a minimal self-replicating cell. This is, in part, why M. genitalium has become a prime candidate for minimal genome project. 

Finding a minimal set of essential genes is usually done by selective inactivation or deletions of genes and then testing the effect of each under a given set of conditions. The J. Craig Venter institute conducted these types of experiment on M. genitalium and found 382 essential genes.

The J.Craig Venter institute later started a project to create a synthetic organism named Mycoplasma laboratorium, using the minimal set genes identified from M. genitalium.

How to begin reconstructing 
Reconstruction of a minimal genome is possible by using the knowledge of existing
genomes via which the sets of genes, essential for living can also be determined. Once
the set of essential genetic elements are known, one can proceed to define the key
pathways and core-players by modeling simulations and wet lab genome engineering.
The two organisms upon which the ‘minimal gene set for cellular life' was
applied were: Haemophilus influenzae, and M. genitalium. A list of orthologous proteins were compiled in hope that it would contain protein necessary for cell survival, as orthologous analysis determines how two organisms evolved and shed away any non-essential genes. Since H. influenza and M. genitalium are Gram negative and Gram positive bacteria and due to their vast evolution it was expected that these organisms would be enriched genes that were of universal importance. However, 244
detected orthologs discovered contained no parasitism-specific proteins. The conclusion of this analysis was that similar biochemical functions might be performed by non-orthologous proteins. Even when biochemical pathways of these two organisms were
mapped, several pathways were present but many were incomplete. Proteins determined
to be common between the two organisms were non-orthologous to each other.
Much of the research mainly focuses on the ancestral genome and less on the minimal
genome. Studies of these existing genomes have helped determine that orthologous gene
found in these two species are not necessarily essential for survival, in fact non-orthologous genes were found to be more important. Also, it was determined that in order for proteins to share same functions they do not need to have same sequence or common three dimensional folds. Distinguishing between orthologs and paralogs and detecting displacements of orthologs have been quiet beneficial in reconstructing evolution and determining the minimal gene set required for a cellular life. Instead, of conducting a strict orthology study, comparing groups of orthologs and occurrence in most clades instead of every species helped encounter genes lost or displaced. Only genomes that have been completely sequenced have enabled in studying orthologs among the group of organisms. Without a fully sequenced genome it would not be possible to determine the essential minimal gene set required for survival.

Essential genes of M. genitalium

J. Craig Venter Institute (JCVI) conducted a study to find all the essential genes of M. genitalium through global transposon mutagenesis. As a result, they found that 382 out of 482 protein coding genes were essential. Genes encoding proteins of unknown function constitute 28% of the essential protein coding genes set. Before conducting this study the JCVI had performed another study on the non-essential genes, genes not required for growth, of M.genitalium, where they reported the use of transposon mutagenesis. Despite figuring out the non-essential genes, it is not confirmed that the products that these genes make have any important biological functions. It was only through gene essentiality studies of bacteria that JCVI has been able to compose a hypothetical minimal gene sets.

The study published in 1999 and 2005
In JCVI's 1999 study among the two organisms, M. genitalium and Mycoplasma pneumoniae they mapped around 2,200 transposon insertion sites and identified 130 putative non-essentials genes in M. genitalium protein coding genes or M. pneumoniae orthologs of M. genitalium genes. In their experiment they grew a set of Tn4001 transformed cells for many weeks and isolated the genomic DNA from these mixture of mutants. Amplicons were sequenced to detect the transposon insertion sites in mycoplasma genomes. Genes that contained the transposon insertions were hypothetical proteins or proteins considered non-essential.

Meanwhile, during this process some of the disruptive genes once considered non-essential, after more analyses turned out essential. The reason for this error could have been due to genes being tolerant to the transposon insertions and thus not being disrupted; cells may have contained two copies of the same gene; or gene product was supplied by more than one cell in those mixed pools of mutants. Insertion of transposon in a gene meant it was disturbed, hence non-essential, but because they did not confirm the absence of gene products they mistook all disruptive genes as non-essential genes.

The same study of 1999 was later expanded and the updated results were then published in 2005.

Some of the disruptive genes thought to be essential were isoleucyl and tyrosyl-tRNA synthetases (MG345 and MG455), DNA replication gene dnaA (MG469), and DNA polymerase III subunit a (MG261). The way they improved this study was by isolating and characterizing M. genitalium Tn4001 insertions in each colony one by one. The individual analyses of each colony showed more results and estimates of essential genes necessary for life.  The key improvement they made in this study was isolating and characterizing individual transposon mutants. Previously, they isolated many colonies containing a mixture of mutants. The filter cloning approach helped in separating the mixtures of mutants.

Now, they claim completely different sets of non-essential genes. The 130 non-essential genes claimed at first have now reduced to 67. Of the remaining 63 genes 26 genes were only disrupted in M. pneumoniae which means that some M. genitalium orthologs of non-essential M. pneumoniae genes were actually essential.

They have now fully identified almost all of the non-essential genes in M. genitalium, the number of gene disruptions based on colonies analyzed reached a plateau as function and they claim a total of 100 non-essential genes out of the 482 protein coding genes in M. genitalium

The ultimate result of this project has now come down to constructing a synthetic organism, Mycoplasma laboratorium based on the 387 protein coding region and 43 structural RNA genes found in M. genitalium.

Mycoplasma laboratorium

This project is currently still going on and it might possibly become the very first life form created by humans. It is quite likely that this line of research may lead to creating a bacterium that could further be engineered to produce fuels, make medicines, take some action on global warming, and make antibiotics.

In May 2010 the JCVI successfully created a "synthetic life form", which will enable them to dissect a genetic instruction set of a bacterial cell and see how it really works.  The synthetic life form was constructed by replacing the DNA of an existing bacterium and replacing it with DNA that was artificially designed and constructed.

Minimal genome projects
A number of projects have attempted to identify the essential genes of a species. This number should approximate the "minimal genome". For instance, the genome of E. coli has been reduced by about 30%, demonstrating that this species can live with much fewer genes than the wild-type genome contains.

The following table contains a list of such minimal genome projects (including the various techniques used).

For more information please refer also to section 'Minimal genome project' at 'Mycoplasma laboratorium'.

Number of essential genes

The number of essential genes is different for each organism. In fact, each organism has a different number of essential genes, depending on which strain (or individual) is tested. In addition, the number depends on the conditions under which an organism is tested. In several bacteria (or other microbes such as yeast) all or most genes have been deleted individually to determine which genes are "essential" for survival. Such tests are usually carried out on rich media which contain all nutrients. However, if all nutrients are provided, genes required for the synthesis of nutrients are not "essential". When cells are grown on minimal media, many more genes are essential as they may be needed to synthesize such nutrients (e.g. vitamins). The numbers provided in the following table typically have been collected using rich media (but consult original references for details).

The number of essential genes were collected from the Database of Essential Genes (DEG), except for B. subtilis, where the data comes from Genome News Network The organisms listed in this table have been systematically tested for essential genes. For more information about minimal genome Please refer also to section 'Other Genera' at 'Mycoplasma laboratorium'.

First self replicating synthetic cell

Researchers at the JCVI in 2010 successfully created a synthetic bacterial cell that was capable of replicating itself. The team synthesized a 1.08 million base pair chromosome of a modified Mycoplasma mycoides. The synthetic cell is called: Mycoplasma mycoides JCVI-syn1.0. The DNA was designed in a computer, synthesized, and transplanted into a cell from which the original genome had been removed. The original molecules and on-going reaction networks of the recipient cell then used the artificial DNA to generate daughter cells.  These daughter cells are of synthetic origin and capable of further replication, solely controlled by the synthetic genome.

The first half of the project took 15 years to complete. The team designed an accurate, digitized genome of M. mycoides. A total of 1,078 cassettes were built, each 1,080 base pairs long These cassettes were designed in a way that the end of each DNA cassette overlapped by 80 base pairs. The whole assembled genome was transplanted in yeast cells and grown as yeast artificial chromosome.

Future direction and uses

Future direction: Based on JCVI's progress in the field of synthetic biology, it is possible that in near future scientists will be able to propagate M. genitalium's genome in the form of naked DNA, into recipient mycoplasmas cells and replace their original genome with a synthetic genome. Since, mycoplasmas have no cell wall, the transfer of a naked DNA into their cell is possible. The only requirement now is the technique to include the synthetic genome of M. genitalium into mycoplasma cells. To some extent this has become possible, the first replicating synthetic cell has already been developed by the JCVI and they are now on to creating their first synthetic life, consisting of minimal number of essential genes. This new breakthrough in synthetic biology will certainly bring in a new approach to understand biology; and this redesigning and prototyping genomes will later become beneficial to biotechnology companies, enabling them to produce synthetic microbes that produce new, cheaper and better bio-products.

Uses of minimal genome:
 Identification of essential genes 
 Reduced genetic complexity that allows greater predictability of engineered strains. 
 Engineer plants to resist herbicides or harsh environmental conditions.
 Synthetically produce pharmaceuticals
 Large scale benefits: clean energy
 Renewable chemicals
 Sequestering carbon from the atmosphere. 
 Create beneficial microbes to make them produce bio-products.

References

Genetics techniques
Genomics